Li Jun is a fictional character in Water Margin, one of the Four Great Classical Novels of Chinese literature. Nicknamed "River Dragon", he ranks 26th among the 36 Heavenly Spirits, the first third of the 108 Stars of Destiny.

Background
The novel depicts Li Jun as eight chi tall and having thick eyebrows, large eyes, a reddish face, wire-like whiskers and a booming voice. Born in Luzhou (蘆州; present-day Hefei, Anhui), he  moves to Jieyang Ridge (揭陽嶺; believed to be in present-day Jiujiang, Jiangxi) with his close friend Li Li. He is a good fighter and an excellent swimmer. As water is like his natural habitat, he is nicknamed "River Dragon".

Li Jun engages in illegal salt smuggling on Xunyang River with his sidekicks Tong Wei and Tong Meng, who are brothers, while Li Li runs an inn on Jieyang ridge, where he drugs, robs and butchers customers.

Joining Liangshan
On his way to exile in Jiangzhou (江州; present-day Jiujiang, Jiangxi) as a mitigated sentence for killing his mistress Yan Poxi, Song Jiang passes by Jieyang Ridge and takes a rest in the inn of Li Li with his two escorts. After drugging the three, Li Li waits for his helpers to come to cut them up. Li Jun and the Tong brothers come to his inn for refreshments. Li Jun has been waiting by the riverbank for days hoping to meet Song Jiang, who is famous for chivalry. Upon learning an exile is drugged, Li Jun immediately frisks the escorts and finds the document confirming the identity of the person. Li Li quickly revives Song. They introduce themselves to Song and treat him as an honoured guest before seeing him off.

Song Jiang passes by Jieyang Town where he offends the Mu brothers (Mu Hong and Mu Chun) by giving money to street performer Xue Yong, who has neglected to pay respect to the Mus. After unknowingly finding accommodation at the house of the Mus thanks to the kindness of the brothers' father, Song and his two escorts have to sneak away when they realise they are close to danger. Pursued by the Mus, the three scramble on to the boat of the pirate Zhang Heng when they come to the bank of Xunyang River. Halfway across the waters, Zhang draws out his knife and asks them whether they would rather be knifed or drowned. Just when the three are resigned to jumping into the river, Li Jun, who is out on the river that night feeling restless, passes by Zhang's boat. Zhang Heng is shocked to learn that the exile is Song Jiang, whom he has heard so much about from Li Jun. He apologises to Song. The Mu brothers, who linger at the bank, are also admirers of Song under the influence of Li. They say sorry to Song for the distress they caused him. Song enjoys their hospitable treatment before continuing on to Jiangzhou.

Song Jiang is arrested and sentenced to death for composing a seditious poem, which he wrote on the wall of a restaurant after getting drunk. The outlaws from Liangshan Marsh hurry to Jiangzhou, storm the execution ground and rescue him and Dai Zong, who is implicated for his attempt to rescue Song. After fleeing Jiangzhou, the group is stranded at a riverbank. Luckily, Li Jun, leading other friends of Song Jiang from the Jieyang region, arrives with boats on his way to rescue Song. Li Jun follows the band to Liangshan.

Contributions to Liangshan
Li Jun is appointed as one of the leaders of the Liangshan flotilla after all the 108 Stars of Destiny came together in what is called the General Assembly. He participates in the campaigns against the Liao invaders and rebel forces in Song territory following amnesty from Emperor Huizong for Liangshan.

In the campaign against Tian Hu, Li Jun proposes flooding the city of Taiyuan to trap the enemy. The move is instrumental in the defeat of Tian.

In the battle on Lake Tai in the campaign against Fang La, Li Jun, leading a group of men in an underwater attack, sinks the enemy's battleships.  At Lake Tai he comes to know some scofflaws, who become his sworn brothers. He also infiltrates Suzhou, contributing to the capture of the city. In the battle of Qingxi County (清溪縣; present-day Chun'an County, Zhejiang), he pretends to defect to Fang La's side and launches a successful interior sabotage.

Later life
When the surviving Liangshan heroes return to the imperial capital Dongjing, Li Jun, averse to serving the government, decides to leave the group. He feigns illness and remains in Suzhou with the company of the Tong brothers.

It is said that Li Jun, the Tong brothers and the friends they made at Lake Tai traveled to the port city of Taicang, where they sailed into the open sea. They arrived in Siam, where Li Jun became king and his companions were made high officials.

See also
 List of Water Margin minor characters#Li Jun's story for a list of supporting minor characters from Li Jun's story.

References
 
 
 
 
 
 
 

36 Heavenly Spirits
Fictional kings
Fictional pirates
Fictional characters from Anhui